Are Prisons Obsolete? by Angela Y. Davis is a nonfiction book published in 2003 by Seven Stories Press that advocates for the abolition of the prison system. The book examines the evolution of carceral systems from their earliest incarnation to the all-consuming modern prison industrial complex. Davis argues that incarceration fails to reform those it imprisons, instead systematically profiting from the exploitation of prisoners. The book explores potential alternatives to the prison system that could transform the justice system from a punitive instrument of control and retribution into a tool capable of changing lives for the better through a combination of autobiography and academic examination. It is a core text in the prison abolition movement.

Summary

Chapter 1: Introduction: Prison Reform or Prison Abolition? 
Davis begins by comparing attitudes towards advocacy for abolishing the death penalty and advocacy for abolishing prisons. Whereas the average person can quite readily imagine a system of justice in which the death penalty has no place, most people cannot imagine the same concerning prisons. Unlike the death penalty, prisons are considered "an inevitable and permanent feature of our social lives". The mission of Are Prisons Obsolete? is to cause the reader to see the prison system as they likely do the death penalty by exposing how unnecessary, ineffective, and inhuman it is. Between 1960 and 2003, the US prison population exploded from 200,000 to over 2,000,000. That makes the United States home to 20% of the world's incarcerated people, a number far out of proportion with its percentage of the world population at large. Davis contends that there is something wrong with this picture and, therefore, something wrong with the systems underlying it.

Reception 
Kim Pate, writing in the Journal of Law and Social Policy, describes Are Prisons Obsolete? as "wonderfully digestible, and therefore accessible", further praising Davis for her recognition of and appreciation for the social realities out of and upon which the modern prison system is built. In Dignity, Savannah Dicus writes that the book "carefully deconstructs prison by examining the origin of imprisonment, its usage as a tool to reinstate institutionalized slavery, and its connections to capitalism." Former 49ers quarterback and free agent Colin Kaepernick wrote that Are Prisons Obsolete? "effectively analyzes the purpose of prisons."

References

2003 non-fiction books
Books by Angela Davis